The Outsider is a 1961 biopic film about Ira Hayes, a Native American who fought in World War II in the United States Marine Corps and was one of the Marines who raised the flag on Iwo Jima. The film stars Tony Curtis as Hayes. It was directed by Delbert Mann.

Jim Sorenson, a Marine depicted as Hayes's best friend, is a fictional composite of other men who raised the flag. The movie was adapted from an article by William Bradford Huie about Hayes.

Plot
17-year-old Ira Hamilton Hayes has never been off the Pima reservation in Arizona until he enlists in the United States Marine Corps.

Hayes is shunned by fellow Marines and mocked as "Chief". All except for one, Jim Sorenson. By chance they are two of the six U.S. servicemen who hoist the U.S. flag on Mount Suribachi during the battle at Iwo Jima. A photograph of them becomes an iconic image of the war, serving as the basis for a memorial that was installed in Arlington, Virginia. After this action, Sorenson is killed by enemy fire.

A morose and traumatized Hayes returns home, where he is proclaimed a hero and recruited to help sell war bonds to the public.  As his depression mounts, Hayes, feeling unworthy of the attention and publicity, takes refuge in whiskey.

Hayes' alcoholism after he leaves the Marine Corps becomes a public scandal. Hayes wishes to be left alone, but a tribal chief implores him to go to Washington, D.C., on his people's behalf to seek political support for an irrigation bill. Not until he attends the dedication of the Marine Corps War Memorial (also called the Iwo Jima Memorial) in Arlington, Virginia on November 10, 1954, does he sober up and pull himself together.

Hayes returns to the reservation, but is deeply disappointed when the tribal council no longer seems to want anything to do with him. He begins drinking again and goes off into the hills, where he dies of exposure to the elements ten years after the Iwo Jima battle. He was 32.

End inscription
"Ira Hayes was buried with
full military honors at
Arlington National Cemetery
on February 2, 1955."

Cast

Tony Curtis as Ira Hayes
James Franciscus as Jim Sorenson
Gregory Walcott as Sergeant Kiley
Bruce Bennett as Major General Bridges
Vivian Nathan as Nancy Hayes
Edmund Hashim as Morago
Paul Comi as Sergeant Boyle
Stanley Adams as Noomie
Wayne Heffley as Corporal Johnson
Ralph Moody as Uncle
Jeff Silver as McGruder
James Beck as Tyler
Forrest Compton as Bradley
Peter Homer, Sr. as Mr. Alvarez
Mary Patton as Chairlady
Uncle JR as an extra

Production
The movie was filmed on location at the Gila River Indian Reservation in Arizona, Marine Corps Recruit Depot San Diego, Camp Calvin B. Matthews in California, Soldier Field in Chicago, San Diego, the Marine Corps War Memorial at Arlington, Virginia, Arlington National Cemetery, and at Universal Studios in California.

See also
 List of American films of 1961
 List of war films and TV specials
 Whitewashing in film

External links
 

1961 films
1960s biographical films
1961 war films
American war films
American biographical films
Battle of Iwo Jima films
Films scored by Leonard Rosenman
Films about Native Americans
Films directed by Delbert Mann
Films with screenplays by Stewart Stern
Films set in Scottsdale, Arizona
Films set in Maricopa County, Arizona
Universal Pictures films
World War II films based on actual events
Pacific War films
Films about the United States Marine Corps
Films shot in Arizona
Films shot in Chicago
Films shot in San Diego
Films shot in Virginia
1960s English-language films
1960s American films